William Southerne (executed at Newcastle-upon-Tyne, 30 April 1618) was an English Roman Catholic priest. He is a Catholic martyr, beatified in 1987.

Life

An alumnus and priest of the English College at Douai and the Royal English College, Valladolid, he was born at Ketton, near Darlington, County Durham, and ministered in Northumberland. He was sentenced to death for being a Catholic priest and refusing to take the oath of allegiance and was stripped, hung, drawn and quartered.

Some later accounts, such as Challoner's Missionary Priests (1741-2), give the place of execution as Newcastle-under-Lyme but they appear to confuse Blessed William Southerne with another priest of a similar name who ministered at Baswich, near Stafford, which then belonged to a branch of the Fowler family.

References

Attribution

1618 deaths
16th-century English Roman Catholic priests
English beatified people
17th-century venerated Christians
Eighty-five martyrs of England and Wales
Year of birth unknown